Michael Chakanaka Bimha (born 1954) is a Zimbabwean politician serving as Minister of State for Industry and Commerce and former Deputy Minister of Industry and Commerce. He is the member of House of Assembly for Chikomba West (ZANU-PF). He is a previous chairman of Air Zimbabwe. In 2013, following Zanu PF's victory in the country elections, Bimha was appointed Minister of Industry and Commerce, replacing Welshman Ncube.

References

Members of the National Assembly of Zimbabwe
Living people
ZANU–PF politicians
1954 births